XHPTUX-FM is a radio station on 101.3 FM in San Juan Bautista Tuxtepec, Oaxaca. It is owned by Grupo Rojaz and carries the Exa FM franchise format from MVS Radio.

History
XHPTUX was awarded in the IFT-4 radio auction of 2017. The initial winning bidder, Tecnoradio, paid 2.35 million pesos for the frequency, but was later disqualified nationwide. Radio Casandoo's third-place bid of 2.265 million pesos was accepted in Tecnoradio's station and the station signed on June 3, 2019, marking the beginning of serious commercial competition in Tuxtepec, which had previously been monopolized by the ORP stations (XHUH-FM and XHXP-FM).

References

Radio stations in Oaxaca
Radio stations established in 2019
2019 establishments in Mexico